The 2017 Guangzhou International Women's Open was a women's tennis tournament played on outdoor hard courts. It was the 14th edition of the Guangzhou International Women's Open, and part of the WTA International tournaments of the 2017 WTA Tour. It took place in Guangzhou, China, from September 18 through September 23, 2017.

Points and prize money

Prize money

1 Qualifiers prize money is also the Round of 32 prize money
* per team

Singles main-draw entrants

Seeds

 1 Rankings are as of September 11, 2017.

Other entrants
The following players received wildcards into the singles main draw:
  Peng Shuai
  You Xiaodi
  Zhang Shuai

The following player received entry using a protected ranking:
  Rebecca Peterson

The following players received entry from the qualifying draw:
  Lizette Cabrera
  Gao Xinyu
  Lesley Kerkhove
  Lu Jingjing
  İpek Soylu
  Zhang Kailin

Withdrawals
Before the tournament
  Ana Bogdan → replaced by  Rebecca Peterson
  Sabine Lisicki → replaced by  Jana Fett
  Zheng Saisai → replaced by  Jasmine Paolini
  Zhu Lin → replaced by  Arina Rodionova

Retirements
  Patricia Maria Tig

Doubles main-draw entrants

Seeds

 1 Rankings are as of September 11, 2017.

Other entrants
The following pair received a wildcard into the doubles main draw:
  Guo Meiqi /  Sun Xuliu

Champions

Singles

  Zhang Shuai def.  Aleksandra Krunić, 6–2, 3–6, 6–2

Doubles

  Elise Mertens /  Demi Schuurs def.  Monique Adamczak /  Storm Sanders, 6–2, 6–3

References

External links
 Official website

Guangzhou International Women's Open
Guangzhou International Women's Open
Guangzhou International Women's Open
Guangzhou International Women's Open